Mar Chiquita is a coastal lagoon in the southeast province of Buenos Aires in eastern Argentina. It is located by the Atlantic coast, 30 km north of Mar del Plata.

The area is a natural reserve where a number of animal species live around Mar Chiquita. There is a small resort on the southern side of the lagoon with population of 487 people as of 2010.

The location was also used as a suborbital launch site at coordinates 37°45' south, 57°25' west between 1968 and 1972; eight sounding rockets of the types Arcas, two rockets of the type Orion-1, and a rocket of the type Dragon, were launched from the site.

Mar Chiquita was designated a Biosphere Reserve by UNESCO in 1995. It was designated a wildlife refuge in 1998 by the Government of Argentina. The refuge covers an area of 560.3 km2.

See also
CELPA (Mar Chiquita)
Rocket launch sites

References

External links
Mar Chiquita launch site
Municipal Information 
Mar Chiquita Partido official site 

Landforms of Buenos Aires Province
Chiquita
Protected areas of Buenos Aires Province
Biosphere reserves of Argentina